This article includes a chart representing proven reserves, production, consumption, exports and imports of natural gas by country. Below the numbers there is specified which position a country holds by the corresponding parameter. Dependent territories, not fully recognized countries and supranational entities are not ranked. By default countries are ranked by their total proven natural gas reserves.

All data is taken from CIA World Factbook. Note that data related to one parameter may be more up to date than data related to some other.

Top producers 
The International Energy Agency top 10 natural gas producers in 2011 were (66.7% of total) (bcm): 1) Russia 677 (20.0%), 2) United States 651 (19.2%), 3) Canada 160 (4.7%), 4) Qatar 151 (4.5%), 5) Iran 149 (4.4%), 6) Norway 106 (3.1%), 7) China 103 (3.0%), 8) Saudi Arabia 92 (2.7%), 9) Indonesia 92 (2.7%), 10) Netherlands 81 (2.4%) and World 3 388 (100%).

Natural gas by country

See also 

List of countries by natural gas proven reserves
List of countries by natural gas production
List of countries by natural gas consumption
List of countries by natural gas exports
List of countries by natural gas imports

General:
 World energy consumption

References

 
Lists by country